La Tourette is a housing complex in Marseille, France. It is located at the Old Port of Marseille and was constructed in 1948–1953 following designs by the French architect and urban planner Fernand Pouillon.

Buildings and structures in Marseille
Apartment buildings in France